Kaloji Kala Kshethram (Telugu: కాళోజి కళా క్షేత్రం) is a cultural convention center, that is being built in the memory of noted poet Kaloji Narayana Rao in Hanamkonda, Warangal.

History 
The foundation stone was laid by K. Chandrashekhar Rao in 2014. However, the project was put on hold due to a lack of funds.

Facilities
The convention center is being built on a three-acre lot, comprising a state-of-the-art auditorium with a seating capacity of 1,000 besides an art gallery, library, marriage hall and a lecture hall. The facilities can be leased by the general public for cultural programs.

References

Convention centres in India